Gerry Mackey (10 June 193321 April 2021) was an Irish former footballer.

After playing for junior side Johnville F.C., he joined Shamrock Rovers in 1951 and made his senior debut on 13 December 1952 at Dalymount Park in a 4-1 win over Bohemians.

He played in the club's first two games in European competition and also won three senior caps for the Republic of Ireland making his debut on 3 October 1956 in a World Cup qualifying win over Denmark at Dalymount Park. His other caps came in a 3-0 friendly win over West Germany the following month and at Wembley against England the following May.

He represented the League of Ireland 10 times while at Glenmalure Park between 1955 and 1958 and also won a B cap in 1958 in a 3-2 win in Iceland. He has the unique distinction of captaining his country at schoolboy, youth and senior level.

In May 1959, Gerry shared a testimonial with Paddy Ambrose.

After four years in London he signed for Limerick F.C. in November 1963.

For four years in the 1970s, he was assistant manager to the Ireland Youths team.

He helped to form KRAM's (Keep Rovers at Milltown) first committee in 1987. His son Dave played for Rovers reserves in the 1980s and won League titles with Dundalk F.C. in the 1990s.

Honours
Shamrock Rovers 
League of Ireland: 3
1953/54, 1956/57, 1958/59
FAI Cup: 2
1955, 1956
League of Ireland Shield: 4
1955, 1956, 1957, 1958
Leinster Senior Cup: 4
1955, 1956, 1957, 1958
Dublin City Cup: 4
1954/55, 1956/57, 1957/58, 1959/1960
Top Four Cup: 2
1955/56, 1957/58
LFA President's Cup: 3
1956/57, 1957/58, 1959/1960

Sources

 The Hoops by Paul Doolan and Robert Goggins
 The Complete Who's Who of Irish International Football, 1945-96 (1996):Stephen McGarrigle

1933 births
2021 deaths
Association footballers from County Dublin
Republic of Ireland association footballers
Republic of Ireland international footballers
Republic of Ireland B international footballers
Shamrock Rovers F.C. players
Limerick F.C. players
League of Ireland players
League of Ireland XI players
Association football defenders